Zacharias Lewala (fl. 1908) was a Namibian worker, considered to have started a diamond rush in the area of Lüderitz in the former colony of German South West Africa, now Namibia, with his discovery of a diamond on 14 April 1908.

Life
Lewala came from southern Africa and was a worker in a diamond mine in Kimberley, where he gained experience in the recognition of rough diamonds. Later he worked under his superior August Stauch at the maintenance of the Lüderitz railway. In 1908, when he was scouting near the railway station at Grassplatz near Kolmanskop, he discovered several stones in which he suspected diamonds. He dutifully handed these over to Stauch and said: "Look, Mister, moy Klip (beautiful stone)." Stauch sent it to the analysis at Swakopmund and secured a claim in the area. Realising the area was full of diamonds, the German government prohibited entry to almost the entire extent of Namibia's southern coast, declaring it the "Sperrgebiet", meaning "forbidden zone".

About Lewala, comparatively little is known, as historiography, and especially tourist literature, are more interested in the German Stauch, whose activity is better documented, and with which European tourists can be more easily identified. Zora del Buono remarks in an article in the German news magazine der Spiegel:"Lewala's name entered history but not much more, the man had nothing of his find, no one paid him for it or showed any kind of gratitude, others made the big business and they made it quick."

References

Martin Eberhardt: Between National Socialism and Apartheid. The German population group of Southwest Africa 1915 - 1965 . Berlin / Münster, Lit 2007.  .
Olga Levinson: Diamonds in the Desert. The Story of August Stauch and His Times. Windhoek, Kuiseb Verlag 2009.

Further reading
 Robert A. Hill (eds.): The Marcus Garvey and Universal Negro Improvement Association Papers . Berkeley, University of California Press, 1995.  , p. 403.
 Harald Stutte / Berliner Zeitung: Ascent and fall of the city Kolmannskuppe . http://www.berliner-zeitung.de/archiv/vor-hundert-jahren-entdeckten-die-deutschen-kolonialherren-in-namibias-wueste-diamanten--der-boom-war-nicht-von-dauer-aufstieg -and-fall-of-town-Kolmannskuppe, 10810590,10549940.html
 Martin Eberhardt: Between National Socialism and Apartheid , p. 144.
 Zora del Buono: Luderitz in Namibia. German spirits in southwest . http://www.spiegel.de/reise/fernweh/0,1518,739185-3,00.html

External links
Picture of Zacharias Lewala on the website of Namdeb Holding : http://www.namdeb.com/images/ZachariasLewala.jpg 
Birgit Magiera: April 10, 1908: Zacharias Lewala releases diamond fever , at www.br.de (retrieved June 7, 2016).

South West Africa
History of Namibia
People from Lüderitz